Dave Morgan (born 29 September 1930) is a former Australian rules footballer who played with Collingwood and Hawthorn in the Victorian Football League (VFL).

Notes

External links 

Dave Morgan's playing statistics from The VFA Project

Living people
1930 births
Australian rules footballers from Victoria (Australia)
Collingwood Football Club players
Hawthorn Football Club players
Brunswick Football Club players